Chas Gessner (born August 17, 1981) is a former American football wide receiver. He was signed by the New England Patriots as an undrafted free agent in 2003 to begin his NFL career and earned a Super Bowl ring in his first year as a member of their practice squad. He played college football and college lacrosse at Brown. He was an All-American in both sports.

Gessner was also a member of the New York Jets, Tampa Bay Buccaneers, Seattle Seahawks, the Berlin Thunder of NFL Europe, Orlando Predators of the Arena League, and the Florida Tuskers of the UFL. 

Chas Gessner is currently the founder and CEO of Vitality Rx which is a Men's health subscription wellness platform targeting the root causes of age-related symptoms through a hybrid of telemedicine and concierge diagnostics.

Early years
Gessner attended Our Lady of the Good Counsel High School in Wheaton, Maryland and was a good student and a letterman in football, basketball, and lacrosse. In football, he won All-County and All-Conference honors. In lacrosse, he was a team captain and won All-America honors.

College career
Chas Gessner was an All-American in Football at the Ivy League's Brown University. He also earned All-American honors on Brown's lacrosse team, making him a rare two-sport All-American at Brown University.

Brown University senior All-American Chas Gessner, who led the nation in receiving, placed sixth in the voting for the Walter Payton Award, presented annually to the nation's top I-AA player. Gessner's sixth-place finish was the highest finish ever for a Brown football player.

A two-time Payton Award finalist, Gessner led the nation with 11.4 receptions per game, completing the 2002 season with 114 receptions, third best in NCAA I-AA history.

Gessner tied an NCAA I-AA record with 24 receptions against Rhode Island, a record held by legendary NFL wide receiver Jerry Rice, who caught 24 passes for Mississippi Valley State against Southern University in 1983. Gessner made 14 catches in the first half alone against the Rams. He hauled in 24 passes for 207 yards and two touchdowns (12 yards, 14 yards), and was named the National I-AA Offensive Player of the Week by The Sports Network, the Ivy League Offensive Player of the Week, and the New England Football Writers Gold Helmet Award Winner.

His average of 11.4 receptions per game is also third in I-AA history. Gessner's 292 career receptions are 4th in NCAA I-AA history, and second in the Ivy League record book, while his 36 career touchdown receptions are second best in Ivy football history and 10th in NCAA I-AA history. Gessner completed his career with 3,408 all-time receiving yards, 18th best in I-AA history.

Professional career

New England Patriots
Gessner earned a Super Bowl ring as a member of the New England Patriots in 2003. He was allocated by the New England Patriots to the Berlin Thunder of NFL Europe, helped them win the World Bowl in 2004 and was named to the All-NFL Europe team.

New York Jets
Subsequently, he joined the New York Jets in 2005.

Tampa Bay Buccaneers
Gessner saw his first significant playing time in a regular season NFL game against the Arizona Cardinals in 2007.

Orlando Predators
Gessner joined the Arena Football League in 2008 with the Orlando Predators where he was honored as the March Rookie of the Month and posted 76 receptions for 801 yards and 20 touchdowns in the first 11 weeks of the season.

Seattle Seahawks
Gessner was signed by the Seattle Seahawks to a two-year contract in May 2008.

Professional Lacrosse
Gessner was drafted 2nd overall by the Baltimore Bayhawks in the MLL 2008 draft in December 2008.

Second stint with Predators
Gessner later re-joined the Orlando Predators and played in their playoff game against the Cleveland Gladiators where he scored 3 touchdowns in the 69-66 loss to the Gladiators.

Florida Tuskers
Gessner was drafted by the Florida Tuskers on the UFL Premiere Season Draft in 2009 and signed with the team on August 17. He was placed on injured reserve on October 25.
Gessner received a DUI in Tampa that year, which subsequently ended his career.

References

External links
Just Sports Stats
Brown Bears bio
United Football League bio

1981 births
Living people
Players of American football from Washington, D.C.
American football wide receivers
Brown Bears football players
New England Patriots players
Berlin Thunder players
New York Jets players
Tampa Bay Buccaneers players
Orlando Predators players
Seattle Seahawks players
Florida Tuskers players
Spokane Shock players
Virginia Destroyers players
People from Wheaton, Maryland